Vanzetta is a surname. Notable people with the surname include:

Bice Vanzetta (born 1961), Italian cross-country skier
Giorgio Vanzetta (born 1959), Italian cross-country skier

See also
Vanzetti